Camillo Eitzen & Co is an international shipping company that operates a total of 51 dry bulk, gas tanker and tanker vessels. Including commercial managed and newbuilding ships the group has 136 vessels. The company is controlled by the Eitzen Group (53%), of which it used to be a part of up until 2004. It is based in Oslo, Norway and is listed on the Oslo Stock Exchange. Camillo Etizen & Co are also majority owners of Eitzen Chemical and Eitzen Maritime Services.

Operations

Bulk
June 2010, CECO has sold its entire stake (74.33%) in Eitzen Bulk Shipping A/S (“Eitzen Bulk Shipping”) to Navieras Ultragas Ltda. at an agreed purchase price of $93MM. CECO do not own any shares in Eitzen Bulk Shipping.

Gas
There are two gas subsidiaries, Eitzen Gas that operates 22 vessels with additional six on order and ENGC that operates 18 vessels with additional three on order. In total 49 vessels operated or on order.

Tanker

The group has six tankers owned through the three subsidiaries (organized as kommandittselskap) Partankers I KS, Partankers II KS and Partankers III AS with two, three and one ships, respectively. The company previously owned the company Tschudi & Eitzen Shipping.

References

External links
 Official website
 Best Quarter Ever For Camillo Eitzen & Co ASA

Eitzen Group
Shipping companies of Norway
Dry bulk shipping companies
Gas shipping companies
Tanker shipping companies
Transport companies established in 1883
Norwegian companies established in 1883